The Ford Comuta was an experimental electric vehicle designed by Ford in the 1960s. The vehicle was powered by four 12-volt 85-Ah lead batteries.

Only a handful Comutas were produced, as the vehicle was an experiment.

References

Electric vehicles
Comuta
Experimental vehicles